Galbula hylochoreutes is an extinct species of jacamar, small birds of the order Piciformes. It was discovered in the La Victoria Formation of the Honda Group, at the Konzentrat-Lagerstätte of La Venta in modern Colombia, in deposits dated to the Laventan period (Middle Miocene, from 13.8 to 11.8 million years ago).

Description 
The species was described from one end of right humerus. Despite the poor of this record, it has distinctive features that permit the classification as a distinct species: the head of the humerus is larger than the modern jacamars (Galbula), so its overall size would also somewhat higher, the tubercle of the head is robust and the insertion of the humeral-scapular-caudal muscle is very large, indicating a strong development of the muscles of his chest and arms, giving great aerobatic skills,  so similar to the birds of the family Tyrannidae (tyrant, flycatchers, earwigs) and Meropidae (bee-eaters), which led to their scientific name of G. hylochoreutes, which in Greek means "dancer of the forests", referring to the jungle environment in which the bird would have lived. Its general appearance would have been similar to the paradise jacamar, Galbula dea.

See also 

 Honda Group

References 

Galbula
Miocene birds of South America
Laventan
Neogene Colombia
Fossils of Colombia
Honda Group, Colombia
Fossil taxa described in 1997